(formerly , abbreviated to TUB) is the local public transport operator in the town Beauvais and its suburbs, in northern France, that opened on 2010.

Organization 
 The  defines the offer of transport (lines, frequency of passing ...), defines tariff policy, supports the large investment and management control of the operator.
  advises and informs the community of agglomeration, manages the network, ensure its smooth operation and implement all the elements that may contribute to the development and use of public transport: training staff, quality, trade policy, general studies.

Intercommunity 
The , which includes 31 municipalities, is served by Corolis.

Fleet 
Corolis fleet consists of more than 40 vehicles, including: Renault Agora, Renault R312 and Irisbus Citelis GNV

References

External links 

Public Transport Route Map

Bus companies of France
Transport operators of France